K. (Kuldip) Rai Sahi is chairman and chief executive officer of Morguard Corporation, one of Canada's largest integrated real estate companies, and chairman and chief executive officer of ClubLink Enterprises Limited, Canada’s largest owner and operator of member golf clubs. In 2009, Sahi was ranked eighth, behind notables such as golfers Mike Weir and Stephen Ames, as one of "The Top 25 Most Influential Figures in Canadian Golf" by Robert Thompson of The National Post.

Sahi immigrated to Canada from India in 1971. He began his career as a laborer in Montreal before going on to build CF Kingsway Inc., Canada's third-largest trucking operation, then branching out into manufacturing and real estate, to become one of the wealthiest Indo-Canadians in Canada.

In "Who Owns Canada Now: Old Money, New Money and The Future of Canadian Business," by Diane Francis, editor-at-large for the National Post, Sahi is portrayed as an example of the "democratization of ownership in Canada from a country in 1986 owned by a few dozen rich families and conglomerates to hundreds of wealthy Canadian families, gigantic pension or mutual funds and millions of Canadian investors."

Sahi has also been described as "the closest thing to a Wall Street raider that you'll find in Canada."

In 2009, Sahi was among seven Indo-Canadians who were conferred with the Voice Achievers Award for 2009 for their outstanding contributions in fields of film, trade, medicine, literature and sports. In 2007, Sahi was appointed to the board of directors of the Canadian Broadcasting Corporation.

Morguard Corporation has extensive retail, office, industrial and residential holdings through its real estate holdings and its investment in Morguard Real Estate Investment Trust (REIT). ClubLink Enterprises operates in two business areas: golf club and resort operations; and rail, tourism and port operations. The corporation owns and operates more than forty golf courses in Ontario, Quebec and Florida. Its subsidiary, White Pass, runs rail, tourism and port operations based in Skagway, Alaska.

Sahi, attended DAV College in Kanpur, India, and received an economics degree.

References

External links
 Morguard
 Clublink
 WPYR Tri-White
 

Canadian businesspeople
Canadian accountants
Living people
Year of birth missing (living people)